Blade Runner 3: Replicant Night is a science fiction novel by American writer K. W. Jeter published in 1996. It is a continuation of Jeter's novel Blade Runner 2: The Edge of Human, which was itself a sequel to both the film Blade Runner and the novel upon which the film was based, Philip K. Dick's Do Androids Dream of Electric Sheep?

Plot introduction 
Living on Mars, Deckard is acting as a consultant to a movie crew filming the story of his days as a blade runner. He finds himself drawn into a mission on behalf of the replicants he was once assigned to kill. Meanwhile, the mystery surrounding the beginnings of the Tyrell Corporation is being exposed.

Characters
Rick Deckard, a former bounty hunter, now working as a film consultant
Sarah Tyrell, the niece of Eldon Tyrell; she has been living on Mars since the events of Blade Runner 2
Anson Tyrell, Sarah's father
Ruth Tyrell, Sarah's mother
Rachael, a ten-year-old girl
Roy Batty, the human template for the replicant Deckard fought in the previous novel. That replicant's personality now resides inside Deckard's briefcase.
Sebastien, a dehydrated deity
Urbenton, director of the movie Blade Runner on which Rick Deckard is a consultant
Dave Holden, Deckard's former police partner.

Film adaptation
The plot element of a replicant giving birth served as the basis for the 2017 film Blade Runner 2049.

See also 

 Blade Runner: Do Androids Dream of Electric Sheep? - original story by P K Dick
 Blade Runner 1: A Story of the Future - film novelization by Les Martin
 Blade Runner 2: The Edge of Human - K. W. Jeter
 Blade Runner 4: Eye and Talon  - K. W. Jeter

References

1996 novels
Blade Runner (franchise)
1996 science fiction novels
Novels by K. W. Jeter
Novels set on Mars
Novels about androids
Novels based on films
Bantam Spectra books